US Highway 25 (US 25) was a part of the United States Numbered Highway System in the state of Ohio that ran from its present terminus near Covington, Kentucky, to its Michigan continuation. By the time it was decommissioned in 1973, all but the section north of Cygnet ran concurrently with Interstate 75 (I-75).

History
Before the U.S. Route system was established in 1926, the road that became US 25 was mostly numbered as State Route 6 (SR 6), but was numbered as SR 28 and SR 124 in the Cincinnati area. In 1950s and 1960s, US 25 was transferred to a new freeway that was the basis for I-75. Nearly all of the original road remains intact, however. In 1973, the route was decommissioned, and the independent portion of the highway (north of Cygnet) became the whole of SR 25.

Major intersections

See also

Notes

References

External links

25
 Ohio
Dixie Highway
Transportation in Hamilton County, Ohio
Transportation in Butler County, Ohio
Transportation in Warren County, Ohio
Transportation in Montgomery County, Ohio
Transportation in Miami County, Ohio
Transportation in Shelby County, Ohio
Transportation in Auglaize County, Ohio
Transportation in Allen County, Ohio
Transportation in Hancock County, Ohio
Transportation in Wood County, Ohio
Transportation in Lucas County, Ohio
25 in Ohio